The General Tire 200 is an ARCA Menards Series race held during the NASCAR Cup Series GEICO 500 weekend at Talladega Superspeedway. Until 2009, it was held during the fall Cup Series weekend.

Footage from the 2006 race was shown in the 2008 U. S. remake of Funny Games.

Past winners

Notes

1991, and 2006: race was shortened due to darkness.

2009 and 2015-2018: The race was extended due to a green–white–checker finish. 
2016 Race ended earlier due to darkness. 
2018 The race was extended to two attempts of GWC finish.

2011 and 2017: The race postponed from Friday to Saturday due to rain.

2013: The race was shortened due to rain.

2018: The finish was the closest margin of victory in ARCA Series history. The official margin of victory was 0.0029 seconds.

References

External links 
 Racing-Reference.info – Talladega Superspeedway

ARCA Menards Series races
Motorsport in Alabama
Recurring sporting events established in 1969
1969 establishments in Alabama
NASCAR races at Talladega Superspeedway